Charles Dow Clark (September 21, 1869 – March 26, 1959) was an actor and an American football coach and referee. He served as the head football coach at the University of Mississippi while taking a leave from his studies at Tufts College in Medford, Massachusetts.

Clark became an actor, appearing in such films as The Bat Whispers (1925) and It Happened in Hollywood (1937).

References

External links
 

1869 births
1959 deaths
American male film actors
Ole Miss Rebels football coaches
Tufts Jumbos football coaches
Tufts University alumni
People from St. Albans, Vermont